The 1948 East Carolina Pirates football team was an American football team that represented East Carolina Teachers College (now known as East Carolina University) as a member of the North State Conference during the 1948 college football season. In their third season under head coach Jim Johnson, the team compiled a 0–9 record.

Schedule

References

East Carolina
College football winless seasons
East Carolina Pirates football seasons
East Carolina Pirates football